The Saskatchewan Glacier is located in Banff National Park, Alberta, Canada, approximately  northwest of the town of Banff, and can be accessed from the Icefields Parkway. Saskatchewan Glacier is the largest outflow glacier from the Columbia Icefield, which rests along the Continental Divide. The glacier is a primary water source for the North Saskatchewan River. The glacier, which flows northeast, exhibits a prominent medial morraine.

See also

List of glaciers in Canada

References

Gallery

Banff National Park
Glaciers of Alberta